Tilty or Tylsey is a village and a civil parish in the Uttlesford district, in the county of Essex, England. In 2001 the population of the civil parish of Tilty was 98.
Tilty's church is dedicated to St Mary the Virgin, and is Grade I listed. It was originally a chapel of Tilty Abbey, which was dissolved in the 1530s; the nave was built circa 1220. A further listed building is the derelict Grade II* Tilty Mill, which dates from the early 18th century. Tilty was recorded in the Domesday Book as Tileteia.

See also
 The Hundred Parishes

References

External links 

 Vision of Britain
 British Listed Buildings
 St Mary The Virgin's Church, Tilty

Villages in Essex
Civil parishes in Essex
Uttlesford